is a Japanese character from the company San-X, who, like Sanrio creations Hello Kitty and Badtz Maru, can be found in books, anime, toys, stationery, and a number of other formats. The character is a burnt red bean bread bun who lives in a panya (Japanese bakery), trying to fit in and make friends with the other bread items. The name comes from kogeru, meaning to burn or char, and pan, a gairaigo word taken from Portuguese and meaning bread.

There are a number of other characters (breads) in the panya with Kogepan, including ichigopan (strawberry bread), kireipan (curry bread), kuriimupan (a burnt cream bread), and Sumipan, a bread even more burnt than Kogepan.

Media

Anime
The anime series, animated by Studio Pierrot and produced by Pony Canyon, consisted of ten 4-minute shorts, the majority of which introduce simple aspects of the character.

Books
There have been three children's picture books published in the Kogepan series, written & drawn by Takahashi Miki:

References

External links
 San-X Official Kogepan Page 
 Anime official profile 
 

Animax original programming
Fictional food characters
San-X characters
Pierrot (company)